The 2nd World Sports Acrobatics Championships were held in Saarbrücken, West Germany, in 1976.

Results

Men's Tumbling

Overall

First Exercise

Second Exercise

Men's Single Pedestal

Overall

First Exercise

Second Exercise

Men's Pair

Overall

First Exercise

Second Exercise

Men's Group

Overall

First Exercise

Second Exercise

Women's Tumbling

Overall

First Exercise

Second Exercise

Women's Single Pedestal

Overall

First Exercise

Second Exercise

Women's Pair

Overall

First Exercise

Second Exercise

Women's Group

Overall

First Exercise

Second Exercise

Mixed Pair

Overall

First Exercise

Second Exercise

References
sports acrobatics : 1976 World Championships

Acrobatic Gymnastics Championships
Acrobatic Gymnastics World Championships
International gymnastics competitions hosted by West Germany
1976 in German sport